In mathematics, the Hodge–de Rham spectral sequence (named in honor of  W. V. D. Hodge and Georges de Rham) is an alternative term sometimes used to describe   the Frölicher spectral sequence (named after Alfred Frölicher, who actually discovered it). This spectral sequence describes the precise relationship between   the Dolbeault cohomology and the de Rham cohomology of a general complex manifold. On a compact Kähler manifold, the sequence degenerates, thereby leading to the Hodge decomposition of the de Rham cohomology.

Description of the spectral sequence
The spectral sequence is as follows:

where X is a complex manifold,  is its cohomology with complex coefficients and the left hand term, which is the -page of the spectral sequence, is the cohomology with values in the sheaf of holomorphic differential forms.
The existence of the spectral sequence as stated above follows from the Poincaré lemma, which gives a quasi-isomorphism of complexes of sheaves

together with the usual spectral sequence resulting from a filtered object, in this case the Hodge filtration

 

Degeneration
The central theorem related to this spectral sequence is that for a compact Kähler manifold X, for example a projective variety, the above spectral sequence degenerates at the -page. In particular, it gives an isomorphism referred to as the Hodge decomposition

The degeneration of the spectral sequence can be shown using Hodge theory. An extension of this degeneration in a relative situation, for a proper smooth map , was also shown by Deligne.

Purely algebraic proof
For smooth proper varieties over a field of characteristic 0, the spectral sequence can also be written as

In this guise, all terms in the spectral sequence are of purely algebraic (as opposed to analytic) nature. In particular, the question of the degeneration of this spectral sequence makes sense for varieties over a field of characteristic p>0.

 showed that for a smooth proper scheme X over a perfect field k of positive characteristic p, the spectral sequence degenerates, provided that dim(X)<p and X admits a smooth proper lift over the ring of Witt vectors W2(k) of length two (for example, for k=Fp, this ring would be Z/p2). Their proof uses the Cartier isomorphism, which only exists in positive characteristic. This degeneration result in characteristic p>0 can then be used to also prove the degeneration for the spectral sequence for X over a field of characteristic 0.

Non-commutative version
The de Rham complex and also the de Rham cohomology of a variety admit generalizations to non-commutative geometry. This more general setup studies dg categories. To a dg category, one can associate its Hochschild homology, and also its periodic cyclic homology. When applied to the category of perfect complexes on a smooth proper variety X, these invariants give back differential forms, respectively, de Rham cohomology of X. Kontsevich and Soibelman conjectured in 2009 that for any smooth and proper dg category C over a field of characteristic 0, the Hodge-de Rham spectral sequence starting with Hochschild homology and abutting to periodic cyclic homology, degenerates:

See also
 Frölicher spectral sequence
 Hodge theory
 Jacobian ideal - useful for computing cohomology of Hodge decomposition

Sources

References

 

 

 

 

Cohomology theories
Complex manifolds
Spectral sequences